Hexanitroethane (HNE) is an organic compound with chemical formula C2N6O12 or (O2N)3C-C(NO2)3.  It is a solid matter with a melting point of 135  °C.

Hexanitroethane is used in some pyrotechnic compositions as a nitrogen-rich oxidizer, e.g. in some decoy flare compositions and some propellants.  Like hexanitrobenzene, HNE is investigated as a gas source for explosively pumped gas dynamic laser.

A composition of HNE as oxidizer with boron as fuel is being investigated as a new explosive.

Preparation 
The first synthesis was described by Wilhelm Will in 1914, using the reaction between the potassium salt of tetranitroethane with nitric acid.

C2(NO2)4K2 + 4 HNO3 → C2(NO2)6 + 2 KNO3 + 2 H2O
A practicable method for industrial use starts with furfural, which first undergoes oxidative ring-opening by bromine to mucobromic acid. In the following step, mucobromic acid is reacted with potassium nitrite at just below room temperature to form the dipotassium salt of 2,3,3-trinitropropanal. The final product is obtained by nitration with nitric acid and sulfuric acid at −60 °C.

Properties 
The thermal decomposition of hexanitroethane has been detected at 60 °C upwards in both the solid and solution phases. Above 140 °C, this can occur explosively. The decomposition is first order and is significantly faster in solution than in the solid. For the solid, the following reaction can be formulated:

C2(NO2)6  → 3 NO2 + NO + N2O + 2 CO2
For the decomposition is solution, tetranitroethylene is first formed and can be trapped and detected as a Diels–Alder adduct, for example with anthracene or cyclopentadiene.

References

External links
WebBook page for C2N6O12

Nitroalkanes
Explosive chemicals
Pyrotechnic oxidizers